Bohumil Kučera (March 22, 1874 in Semily – April 16, 1921 in Prague) was a Czech physicist.

Biography
Kučera studied physics at the Charles University in Prague and was the first scientist in Czech lands to examine the newly discovered effect of radioactivity. In 1912 he became professor of experimental physics at the university. He was the first to study droplets of mercury used as electrode (author of Zur Oberflächenspannung von polarisiertem Quecksilber, 1903).  His work was the basis for the discovery of polarography by Jaroslav Heyrovský.

Kučera died prematurely due to his bohemian lifestyle.

External links
 Very short biography (in Czech)

1874 births
1921 deaths
People from Semily
Czech physicists
Charles University alumni
Physicists from the Austro-Hungarian Empire